Big House, U.S.A. is a 1955 American crime film directed by Howard W. Koch and written by John C. Higgins. The film stars Broderick Crawford, Ralph Meeker, Reed Hadley, William Talman, Lon Chaney, Jr., and Charles Bronson. The film was released on March 3, 1955, by United Artists.

Plot
At a summer camp near a Colorado national park, a young boy runs a short race against his fellow campers and collapses with a severe asthma attack. The boy is taken to the camp's infirmary where  a nurse, Emily Evans, tries to help him with a drug given by injection. As she approaches him with a syringe  in her hand, the boy who is terrified of needles, runs away into the woods, where after a while Jerry Barker finds him.

Park ranger Erickson tries to calm wealthy Robertson Lambert, the missing boy's frantic father. Barker has demanded a $200,000 ransom for the boy's safe return and warned Lambert not to tell anyone or he will kill his son. Lambert agrees to pay the ransom. Barker goes to collect the money and leaves the boy behind. The boy tries to escape from the hiding place he is in and accidentally falls to his death. When Barker returns and sees the body he coldly throws the body over a cliff and buries most of the money.

Caught by agent Madden of the FBI, Barker is convicted of extortion, but not murder because no 
body is found. He is sent to prison, where the warden hopes to intimidate Barker by throwing the child killer together with four of the most hardened convicts in stir, bank robber Rollo Lamar, smuggler Alamo Smith, and cold-blooded killers Mason and Kelly.

Barker becomes known as the "ice man" because of his cold, icy persona in court when he was convicted. He also gains the prisoners' trust after discovering their escape plan and not informing. But when they take him along on the breakout, it is not out of friendship but because they're after the hidden ransom money.

Madden is in hot pursuit. He has discovered that Emily, the nurse, had been in on Barker's scheme from the start. Back in the park, the fugitives turn on one another until only two are left. Mason is gunned down, and Lamar begs for his life. The money is recovered, Barker and Lamar go back to prison to face the gas chamber, and Emily is given a long sentence behind bars.

Cast
Broderick Crawford as Rollo Lamar
Ralph Meeker as Jerry Barker
Reed Hadley as Special FBI Agent James Madden
William Talman as William 'Machine Gun' Mason
Lon Chaney, Jr. as Alamo Smith 
Charles Bronson as Benny Kelly
Felicia Farr as Emily Euridice Evans
Roy Roberts as Chief Ranger Will Erickson
Willis Bouchey as Robertson Lambert
Peter J. Votrian as Danny Lambert
Robert Bray as Ranger McCormick

References

External links
 

1955 films
Film noir
1955 crime films
American black-and-white films
American crime films
American prison films
Films directed by Howard W. Koch
Films set in Colorado
Films scored by Paul Dunlap
United Artists films
1950s English-language films
1950s American films